Hazaveh (also Romanized as Hazāveh; also known as Hazāreh, Hīzāveh, and Hizāwah) is a village in Amiriyeh Rural District, in the Central District of Arak County, Markazi Province, Iran. At the 2006 census, its population was 1,587, in 474 families.

References 

Populated places in Arak County